Yves Duval (21 March 1934 – 22 May 2009) was a Belgian comics author who mainly worked for Tintin magazine, but also wrote comics, stories, and articles for other magazines.

Biography
Yves Duval was born in Etterbeek. He started working for Tintin magazine when he was 16, writing short stories for a number of authors like Raymond Reding. He would eventually write about 1500 4-page true stories as Tintin's reaction against L'oncle Paul which appeared in Spirou magazine. Among the many artists who illustrated these comics are well-known names like Paul Cuvelier, Jean Graton, René Follet, Hermann, Eddy Paape, Jean-Claude Servais, and Jo-El Azara.

His first longer comic was an adaptation of David Balfour by Robert Louis Stevenson, with artwork by Jacques Laudy. He also wrote longer stories for Berck, for whom he created the series Rataplan, Howard Flynn for William Vance, Johnny Goodbye for Dino Attanasio, Doc Silver for Liliane and Fred Funcken and many more.

He wrote his memoirs 55 ans de bulles in 2008, and died in 2009.

Bibliography
Alerte aux pirates, art by Hermann, 1 album, 1980, Bédéscope
Arthur au royaume de l'impossible, art by Philippe Delaby, 1 album, Le Lombard, 1991
Candida, art by Dino Attanasio, 1 album, 2006, Miklo
Le Croissant et la croix, art by Liliane and Fred Funcken, 1 album, 1985, Le Lombard
Les Dalton, art by Hermann, 1 album, 1980, Bédéscope
David Balfour, art by Jacques laudy, 1 album, 1980, Distri BD
Doc Silver, art by Liliane and Fred Funcken, 5 albums, 1968-1974, Le Lombard
Les Fabuleux Exploits d'Eddy Merckx, art by Christian Lippens, 1 album, 1973, Arts & Voyages Gamma
Flamberge au vent, art by Liliane and Fred Funcken, 1 album, 2008, Hibou
Flash-Back et la 4e dimension, art by Dino Attanasio, 1 album, 1979, Michel Deligne
Les Franval, art by Edouard Aidans, 12 albums, 1966-1980, Le Lombard, Dargaud and Bédéscope
Graine de jockey, art by Franz Drappier, 1 album, 1973, Rossel
Les Grandes catastrophes, art by Ferry, 1 album, 1984, Le Lombard
Hassan et Kadour, art by Jacques laudy, 1 album, 1978, Bédéscope
Howard Flynn, art by William Vance, 3 albums, 1966-1969, Le Lombard
Johnny Goodbye, art by Dino Attanasio, 2 albums, 1984-1986, Archers
Justine, art by Edouard Aidans, 1 albums, 2007, Dupuis
Ken Krom, art by Berck, 1 album, 2010, BD Must
Kenton, art by Berck, 1 album, 2010, BD Must
Lady Bound, art by Berck, 1 album, 2010, BD Must
Lieutenant Burton, art by Liliane and Fred Funcken, 1 album, 1980, Jonas
Les Meilluers recits de ..., art by various artists, 27 albums, 2002-..., Hibou
La Prodigieuse épopée du Tour de France, art by Marc Hardy, 1 album, 1973, Arts & Voyages Gamma
Rataplan, art by Berck, 7 albums, 1968-1973, Le Lombard
Richard Cœur de Lion, art by Philippe Delaby, 1 album, 1991, Le Lombard
RSC Anderlecht, art by Charles Jarry, 1 album, 2008, Dupuis
Spaghetti, art by Dino Attanasio, 1 album, 1982, Dargaud
Val, art by Eddy Paape, 1 album, 2006, JD
Viva Panchico, art by Berck, 1 album, 2010, BD Must

References

External links
Biography at Lambiek's Comiclopedia

1934 births
2009 deaths
Belgian comics writers
People from Etterbeek